Orient Express is a 1944 German thriller film directed by Viktor Tourjansky and starring Siegfried Breuer, Gusti Wolf and Rudolf Prack.

The film's sets were designed by the art director Ludwig Reiber. It was shot at the Bavaria Studios in Munich.

Cast
 Siegfried Breuer as Baron Erich Hübner
 Gusti Wolf as Sonja Promshek
 Rudolf Prack as Franz Schulz
 Lisa Siebel as Frau Dr. Inge Geldern
 Paul Dahlke as Police Commisar Iwanowitsch
 Oskar Sima as Mischa Kowa, reporter
 Joseph Offenbach as Inspector Kosta Balaban
 Hilde Sessak as Vera Voneitz, aka Vera Pamalet
 Lotte Lang as Mizzi Treff
 Nicolas Koline as Der Schlafwagenschaffner
 Heini Handschumacher as Holzer, private detective
 Albert Lippert as Franko, lawyer
 Tibor Halmay as Jango
 Georg Vogelsang as Anton Brukenhauser
 Viktor Afritsch as Garwinsky
 Walther Jung as Die Excellenz

References

Bibliography 
 Mauricio Wiesenthal. The belle époque of the Orient-Express. Crescent Books, 1979.

External links 
 

1944 films
Films of Nazi Germany
German thriller films
1940s thriller films
1940s German-language films
Films directed by Victor Tourjansky
German black-and-white films
Films set on the Orient Express
Bavaria Film films
Films shot at Bavaria Studios
1940s German films